Benjaloud Youssouf (born 11 February 1994) is a professional footballer who plays as a midfielder for French club LB Châteauroux. Born in France, he represents Comoros at international level.

Club career
Born in Marseille, Youssouf was part of the FC Nantes U19 side that reached the semi-final of the Coupe Gambardella. He joined Orléans in 2013 and turned professional with them.

In June 2017 he moved to AJ Auxerre, signing a three-year contract.

At the end of his Auxerre contract, having not featured for the first team for the whole 2019–20 season, Youssouf signed for Le Mans.

On 23 June 2021, he signed a two-year contract with Châteauroux.

International career
Youssouf made his international debut for Comoros in 2015.

International goals
Scores and results list Comoros' goal tally first, score column indicates score after each Youssouf goal.

References

1994 births
Living people
French sportspeople of Comorian descent
Comorian footballers
French footballers
Footballers from Marseille
Association football midfielders
Comoros international footballers
2021 Africa Cup of Nations players
FC Nantes players
US Orléans players
AJ Auxerre players
Le Mans FC players
LB Châteauroux players
Ligue 2 players
Championnat National players